Cirrus Vodka is an American potato vodka brand manufactured in Richmond, Virginia, by the Parched Group. The brand was introduced in 2004, and re-established in 2014 after a foreclosure in 2013.

Awards
Gold medal - 2006 San Francisco World Spirits Competition.

Bronze medal, Packaging - 2005 San Francisco World Spirits Competition.

References

External links
Official website

American vodkas
Economy of Richmond, Virginia